Scott David Menville (born February 12, 1971) is an American actor who is known for his voice work in animated films, television series and video games.

Life and career
Menville was born on February 12, 1971, to television animator and writer Chuck Menville (1940–1992).

His first role came in 1979 in an episode of Scooby-Doo and Scrappy-Doo. He is perhaps best known for providing the voice of Robin on the Teen Titans animated series, Lloyd Irving on Tales of Symphonia, taking over the role of Freddy Flintstone from Lennie Weinrib on The Flintstone Kids, and Ma-Ti on Captain Planet and the Planeteers.

He also voiced Jonny Quest on The New Adventures of Jonny Quest, Quicksilver on The Super Hero Squad Show, and Kevin French on Mission Hill.

Menville is also a musician. He was the bassist for the Southern California rock band Boy Hits Car, which released three albums before he left the band in 2006; he had been a founding member of the band. Menville has also participated in non-voice acting roles. He appeared in Ernest Goes to Camp as Crutchfield and had recurring roles on Full House as Kimmy Gibbler's boyfriend Duane, and on The Wonder Years as Wayne's best friend Wart.

He did the voices of Metamorpho in Batman: The Brave and the Bold, JT and Jimmy Jones on Ben 10, and reprised his role as Robin in Teen Titans Go!.

In 2016, he played Arthur, the Goodwin twins' computer in the TV series Second Chance and Sneezy in the Disney XD animated TV series The 7D. Later that same year, he also reprised his role as Duane on Fuller House.In 2023 he played the role Declan on Oddballs.

Filmography

Live-action roles

Film

Television

Voice over roles

Film

Television

Video games

References

External links

1971 births
Living people
Alternative rock bass guitarists
American alternative rock musicians
American male child actors
American male comedians
American male film actors
American male bass guitarists
American male radio actors
American male television actors
American male video game actors
American male voice actors
American rock bass guitarists
Guitarists from California
Male actors from Los Angeles County, California
Musicians from Los Angeles County, California
20th-century American bass guitarists
21st-century American bass guitarists
20th-century American comedians
21st-century American comedians
20th-century American male actors
21st-century American male actors
20th-century American male musicians
21st-century American male musicians